TianMu West Road is an east–west direction main road in Taiwan, Taipei, Tianmu area. There's a bridge on this road and the river it across, Huangxi, which divide Shilin District and Beitou District, therefore, this road is also an important road because it connects two districts together. Its former name in the years when the American armies were still in Taiwan, was combined with Tianmu North Road now, became "L" shaped road, and they've called it Tianmu Third Road. Now Tianmu North Road has a republic, and west side of Tianmu North Road, which continues the Tianmu West Road and was called Shipai Thirty-sixth Road in 1970, has combined in 1991 and became what we know and what we can see now
. This is a non-sectionized, two sides, two ways road, and the width is 28m, the length is 888m.

Roadsides are mainly the third sort of business land(cite from Construction and Planning Agency, MOI), which was the Tianmu shopping center before. Others, there is the Third type of residential, market land, square land, parkland, and green space land.

The sights and stores beside this road 
(Note: Unmarked alleys are located on the road)

 Tianmu square(Tianmu creation market)
 PX mart  Tianmu store (former MATSUSEI Tianmu)
 Jasons Market Place Tianmu store(former Wellcome Tianmu store)
 Kingstone Bookstore Tianmu store
 McDonald's Tianmu Store (which was closed on June 21, 2019, is the first McDonald's that has a drive-thru in Taiwan)
 China Trust Bank North Tianmu Branch
 Yuanda Commercial Bank Tianmu Branch
 Starbucks New Tianmu Store (closed on May 29, 2018, the first Starbucks coffee shop in Taiwan)
 Louisa Coffee Tianmu Direct Store
 Jiangjia Beef Noodle & Yonghe Soymilk (Lane 41)
 HSBC Tianmu Branch
 Seattle's coffee Tianmu shop
 Cathay United World Bank Tianmu Branch
 Red Apple Life Department Store
 Soho Children's Art Museum (Lane 50)
 Foundation for International Cooperation and Development (Lane 62)
 Embassy Special Zone (Lane 62)
 Tianshou Park (Lane 62)
 Tianmei Green Land (Lane 95)
 Huangxi Bridge (carway)
 Peer bridge (pedestrian bridge, in Chinese called "Tongxing Bridge", built by Tianshou Li)
 Zhengxing Park (Lane 101)
 Hongying Villa (Lane 117)
 Zhengde Temple (Lane 120)
 Louisa Coffee Tianmu Veterans General Hospital Store (Lane 130)
 Taipei Veterans General Hospital (end of road)

The Tianmu West Road is the main road for the contact with the Tianmu and the Shipai. It is often used as the dividing line for geographical division such as district and Li boundary.

Inner boundary

Activity 

 In "TAIPEI TIANMU HALLOWEEN FESTIVAL", Tianmu West Road is a special road for Trick or Treat events. Every year has an event that have some special merchant to participate with.
 This road is the main thoroughfare connecting Zhongshan North Road and Taipei Veterans General Hospital, besides, the Embassy Special Zone is also located in Lane 62 of this section. Therefore, there are often police officers conducting traffic control. It can be seen that the diplomat sedans exercise diplomatic immunity and accompany the escort guards.
 The Tianmu Creation Market will have a creative market stall every Friday, Saturday and Sunday.

Transportations

Buses 

 Although the Tianxi dispatching station is also known as the Tianmu West Station, the location is not at Tianmu West Road, just to distinguish the two stations of Guanghua Bus in the Tianmu area (Tiandong Dispatching Station).

Public bicycle rental station 

 Ubike Zhongshan Tianmu Intersection Station (former sidewalk No. 3-55, Tianmu West Road)

See also 

 Tianmu
 Zhongshan North Road
 Foundation for International Cooperation and Development
 Embassy Special Zone

Citation 

Roads in Taipei